Curry Rivel is a village and civil parish in Somerset, England, situated  west of Somerton and  east of Taunton in the South Somerset district. The parish has a population of 2,148. The parish includes the hamlet of Burton Pynsent.

History

The site of a Roman house has been discovered south of Fairview House. The site is on the Heritage at Risk Register due to ploughing.

The unusual name Curry Rivel, comes from the Celtic word , meaning boundary and Rivel from its 12th century landlord Sir Richard Revel.

In 1237 the king granted Henry de l'Orti a licence to empark his woods in Curry Rivel separating it from the control of the foresters of Castle Neroche.

Curry Rivel was part of the hundred of Abdick and Bulstone.

Notable structures

Earnshill House was built in 1725 by John Strachan for Henry Combe, a prominent Bristol merchant.

Burton Pynsent House was built around 1756 for William Pitt, after he inherited the estate from Sir William Pynsent, 2nd Baronet. It formed part of a wing on a larger earlier house, that was demolished around 1805. It has been designated by English Heritage as a Grade II* listed building. The grounds were laid out in the mid 18th century by Lancelot Brown and William Pitt, Earl of Chatham, and include early 20th century formal gardens designed by Harold Peto. The Chatham Vase is a stone sculpture commissioned as a memorial to William Pitt the Elder by his wife, Hester, Countess of Chatham. It was originally erected at their house in Burton Pynsent, in 1781, and moved to the grounds of Chevening House in 1934, where it currently resides.

The  Pynsent Column (also known as the Curry Rivel Column, Burton Pynsent Monument, Pynsent Steeple or Cider Monument) stands on Troy Hill, a spur of high ground about 700 m north-east of the house. It was designed in the 18th century by Capability Brown for William Pitt. It was restored in the 1990s by the John Paul Getty Trust and English Heritage.

Midelney Place is a Victorian architecture country house, completed in 1866.

Governance
The parish council has responsibility for local issues, including setting an annual precept (local rate) to cover the council's operating costs and producing annual accounts for public scrutiny. The parish council evaluates local planning applications and works with the local police, district council officers, and neighbourhood watch groups on matters of crime, security, and traffic. The parish council's role also includes initiating projects for the maintenance and repair of parish facilities, as well as consulting with the district council on the maintenance, repair, and improvement of highways, drainage, footpaths, public transport, and street cleaning. Conservation matters (including trees and listed buildings) and environmental issues are also the responsibility of the council.

The village falls within the Non-metropolitan district of South Somerset, which was formed on 1 April 1974 under the Local Government Act 1972, having previously been part of Langport Rural District. The district council is responsible for local planning and building control, local roads, council housing, environmental health, markets and fairs, refuse collection and recycling, cemeteries and crematoria, leisure services, parks, and tourism. The population of this electoral ward at the 2011 Census was 2,527.

Somerset County Council is responsible for running the largest and most expensive local services such as education, social services, libraries, main roads, public transport, policing and fire services, trading standards, waste disposal and strategic planning.

There is an electoral ward of the same name. The ward extends beyond Curry Rivel to include Midelney. The total ward population taken at the 2011 census was 2,527.

It is also part of the Somerton and Frome county constituency represented in the House of Commons of the Parliament of the United Kingdom. It elects one Member of Parliament (MP) by the first past the post system of election, and was part of the South West England constituency of the European Parliament prior to Britain leaving the European Union in January 2020, which elected seven MEPs using the d'Hondt method of party-list proportional representation.

Religious sites
The Anglican parish Church of St Andrew dates from the 13th century and is designated as a Grade I listed building.

References

External links

 Curry Rivel community Website

Villages in South Somerset
Civil parishes in Somerset